Michael Betts (born 21 September 1956) is an English retired professional footballer who played as a centre-back.

Career
Betts played in the Blackpool youth system. In 1974, the Blackpool youths won the Caligaris International Tournament. In 1975, he moved up to the first team. In 1976, he transferred to Sligo Rovers where he won Sligo's first ever League of Ireland Championship in the 1976–77 season.

In November 1977 he signed for John Giles at Shamrock Rovers where he made his only league appearance at Glenmalure Park. Despite scoring the winner against a Manchester United selection the same week he left Ireland soon after.

In 1979, Betts played for the Cleveland Cobras in the American Soccer League.

Honours
Sligo Rovers
 League of Ireland: 1976–77

References

External links
 Profile at NASL jerseys

Living people
1956 births
English footballers
Association football central defenders
English Football League players
American Soccer League (1933–1983) players
League of Ireland players
Blackpool F.C. players
Sligo Rovers F.C. players
New York Apollo players
Shamrock Rovers F.C. players
Cleveland Cobras players
Southport F.C. players
Northwich Victoria F.C. players
Bury F.C. players
English expatriate footballers
English expatriate sportspeople in the United States
Expatriate soccer players in the United States